Butte Creek Falls, is a waterfall located on the south east of Scotts Mills, in Marion County, in the U.S. state of Oregon. It totals 78 feet fall in one wide cascade and is the centerpiece attraction of the Butte Creek Falls trailhead and Recreation Site.

See also 
 List of waterfalls in Oregon

References 

Waterfalls of Oregon
Parks in Marion County, Oregon